Kormesiy or Kormesii was a ruler (khan) of Danubian Bulgaria in the first half of the 8th century.  Western chronicles name Kormesiy "the third ruler over the Danube Bulgars", and he is sometimes considered the direct successor of Tervel.

The Nominalia of the Bulgarian khans (Imennik) contains traces of two damaged records between the entries for Tervel and Sevar, and the second of these lost names is generally taken to be that of Kormesiy.  According to the Imennik, Kormesiy would have reigned for 28 years and was a descendant of the royal Dulo clan.  According to the chronology developed by Moskov, Kormesiy would have reigned 715–721, and the longer period reflected in the Imennik would have indicated the duration of his life or would have included a period of association with his predecessors.  Other chronologies date the reign of Kormesiy to 721–738 but cannot be reconciled with the data of the Imennik.

Kormesiy is encountered in relation to the events surrounding the peace treaty between Bulgaria and the Byzantine Empire between 715 and 717 – the chronology has to be argued from the names of the Emperor and patriarch involved – for which our only source is the Byzantine chronicler Theophanes the Confessor. According to Theophanes, the treaty was signed by Kormesiy as ruler of the Bulgars. This comes at odds with the way the same writer implies, elsewhere in the chronicle, that Tervel was still Bulgaria's ruler as late as 718/719. One or the other of Theophanes's statements must then be wrong. Otherwise it would have to be assumed that Kormesiy shared the throne with Tervel and signed the treaty as his co-ruler. The name of Kormesiy was also read by some scholars in the inscriptions around the Madara Rider monument. The surviving part of the text would thus speak of an annual gold tribute that Kormesiy received from the Byzantine Emperor: in other words, the peace treaty would have been re-established during his rule. The end of the inscription mentions a worsening of Bulgarian relations with the Byzantine Empire. However, this inscription could possibly be referring to the later Bulgarian rulers Kormisosh or Krum.

Kormesiy is not mentioned in any other historical context. The fact that there is no record of wars between Bulgaria and the Byzantine Empire during his reign, however, implies that he sustained the peace between the two countries.

Kormesiy Peak on Greenwich Island in the South Shetland Islands, Antarctica is named after Kormesiy.

References

Sources
 Mosko Moskov, Imennik na bălgarskite hanove (novo tălkuvane), Sofia 1988.
 Jordan Andreev, Ivan Lazarov, Plamen Pavlov, Koj koj e v srednovekovna Bălgarija, Sofia 1999.
 (primary source), Bahši Iman, Džagfar Tarihy, vol. III, Orenburg 1997.
 „Канасубиги” е „княз”, а не „хан ” или „кан”

Monarchs of the Bulgars
8th-century Bulgarian monarchs
738 deaths
Year of birth unknown
Dulo clan
Khans